Next is the second album by The Sensational Alex Harvey Band, released in 1973.

The album was featured in Robert Dimery's book 1001 Albums You Must Hear Before You Die.

It has been reissued separately on CD numerous times since 1985, and is also widely available on a 2-in-1 album, the other album being the group's debut Framed.

Track listing

Personnel

The Sensational Alex Harvey Band
 Alex Harvey – lead vocals, harmonica, guitar
 Zal Cleminson – guitar, backing vocals
 Chris Glen – bass guitar, backing vocals
 Hugh McKenna – electric piano, organ, grand piano, backing vocals
 Ted McKenna – drums, percussion, backing vocals

Technical
 Phil Wainman – producer
 Pete Coleman – engineer 
 John Mills – engineer
 David Batchelor – assistant producer, backing vocals
 Pip Williams – arrangements on "Swampsnake", "Gang Bang", "Next" and "The Last of the Teenage Idols"
 Dave Field – sleeve

Cover versions

"Swampsnake" was covered by American rock band Zilch on their 1998 debut album 3.2.1..

Recoil covered "The Faith Healer" in 1992 on their album Bloodline with Douglas McCarthy of Nitzer Ebb on vocals. Other covers have been made by the Australian band The Church on their 1999 covers album A Box of Birds. In the same year, ex-Marillion singer Fish released his version on the album Raingods With Zippos. Heavy metal band Helloween also covered the song in their 1999 album Metal Jukebox, as did metal singer Udo Dirkschneider (Accept, U.D.O.) on his 2022 album of cover versions, My Way.

Charts

Certifications

References

External links

Next (Adobe Flash) at Radio3Net (streamed copy where licensed)

The Sensational Alex Harvey Band albums
1973 albums
Albums produced by Phil Wainman
Vertigo Records albums
Albums recorded at Apple Studios